The siege of Kehl may refer to one of four sieges of the fortress above the town of Kehl, located in present-day southwestern Germany, across the Rhine River from Strasbourg:
 Siege of Kehl (1678), during the Franco-Dutch War
 Siege of Kehl (1703), during the War of the Spanish Succession
 Siege of Kehl (1733), during the War of the Polish Succession
 Siege of Kehl (1796), during the French Revolutionary Wars

Kehl